Monkey vs. Shark is an EP by American indie rock band Thee More Shallows. It was released on Monotreme Records and Turn Records in 2006.

Track listing
Monotreme Records version

Turn Records version

References

External links

2006 EPs
Thee More Shallows albums